Michkovo is a rural locality (a village) in Staroselskoye Rural Settlement, Vologodsky District, Vologda Oblast, Russia. The population was 17 as of 2002.

Geography 
Michkovo is located 64 km west of Vologda (the district's administrative centre) by road. Bolshoye is the nearest rural locality.

References 

Rural localities in Vologodsky District